There are several rivers named São Lourenço River in Brazil:

 São Lourenço River (Juquiá River tributary)
 São Lourenço River (Mato Grosso)
 São Lourenço River (Paraná)
 São Lourenço River (Rio Grande do Sul)
 São Lourenço River (Tietê River tributary)